Stabat Mater is a one-man funeral doom band from Finland. The band was formed in 2001 by Mikko Aspa of Deathspell Omega and Clandestine Blaze fame. Stabat Mater received underground acclaim following a 2002 split album with Worship. For this release, Stabat Mater contributed a track titled "Give Them Pain". Stabat Mater's first full-length album was released on July 10, 2009, by Northern Heritage records.

Discography

Full-length albums
2009 - Stabat Mater (S/T CD, NH-066)
2021 - Treason by Son of Man (CD, NH-113)

Split albums
2002 - Stabat Mater/Worship
2003 - A Slow March to the Burial - with Mournful Congregation
2004 - Church of the Flagellation - with Bunkur, Malasangre and The Sad Sun
2005 - Crushing the Holy Trinity (Father) - with Deathspell Omega
2006 - Stabat Mater/A.M.

Demos
2001 - Rehearsal (also known as Promo 2004)

References

Finnish doom metal musical groups
Musical groups established in 2001